A phreaking box is a device used by phone phreaks to perform various functions normally reserved for operators and other telephone company employees.

Most phreaking boxes are named after colors, due to folklore surrounding the earliest boxes which suggested that the first ones of each kind were housed in a box or casing of that color.  However, very few physical specimens of phreaking boxes are actually the color for which they are named.

Most phreaking boxes are electronic devices which interface directly with a telephone line and manipulate the line or the greater system in some way through either by generating audible tones that invoke switching functions (for example, a blue box), or by manipulating the electrical characteristics of the line to disrupt normal line function (for example, a black box).  However a few boxes can use mechanical or acoustic methods - for example, it is possible to use a pair of properly tuned whistles as a red box.

List of phreaking box types 
This is not a comprehensive list. Many text files online describe various "boxes" in a long list of colors, some of which are fictional (parodies or concepts which never worked), minor variants of boxes already listed or aftermarket versions of features (line in use indicators, 'hold' and 'conference' buttons) commonly included in standard multi-line phones.

This list of boxes does not include wiretapping "bugs", pirate broadcasting apparatus or exploits involving computer security.

See also 
 Walter L. Shaw
 John Draper
 Phreaking
 Dual-tone multi-frequency signaling

External links 
  Rosenbaum, Ron. Secrets of the Little Blue Box. Esquire Magazine October 1971
 
  published on 2600: The Hacker Quarterly, Volume 19 Number 1 (Spring 2002 issue), page 15 (author's website)

 
Phreaking